Four Oaks railway station serves the Four Oaks area of Sutton Coldfield, West Midlands, England.  It is situated on the Cross-City Line.  The station, and all trains serving it, are operated by West Midlands Railway.

History
The station opened in 1884, when the London and North Western Railway's line from Birmingham to Sutton Coldfield was extended to Lichfield.  More recently, in May 1978 Four Oaks became the northern terminus of the newly inaugurated Cross-City Line from  via Birmingham New Street, with trains running up to every 10 minutes in each direction.

The line to the north towards Lichfield City had a less frequent service to begin with (Lichfield being outside the West Midlands PTE boundary), but the growing popularity of the route led to it gaining additional services by the mid-1980s. Eventually, the line was extended to Lichfield Trent Valley in November 1988.  Electric operation at the station commenced in 1992 (as far as New Street), with the full line through to Redditch following suit in July 1993.

Four Oaks remains a terminus for some services from the south, which mostly use the dead-end platform 3 on the eastern side of the station to turn back.  Northbound trains continuing to Lichfield use platform 1 and southbound ones from there use platform 2 (though this can also be used for terminating trains from the south if required).

Facilities
The station has a staffed ticket office on the eastern island platform, which is open seven days per week (Monday - Friday 06:00 - 20:00, Saturday 07:00 - 20:00, Sunday 09:00 - 16:00).  Ticket machines are available on platforms 1 and 2/3 for use outside these times and for collecting pre-paid tickets.  Train running information is provided by customer help points, timetable posters, automated announcements and CIS displays. Step-free access is available to all three platforms.

Services
The station is served by West Midlands Trains with local Transport for West Midlands branded "Cross-City" services, operated by Class 323 electrical multiple units. The station is served by four trains an hour in each direction on weekdays and Saturdays (every 30 minutes on Sundays), with an average journey time to Birmingham New Street of around 24 minutes.

Notes

References
An Historical Survey Of Selected LMS Stations Vol. One Dr R Preston and R Powell Hendry. Oxford Pub. Co. (1982, Reprinted in 2001)

External links

Rail Around Birmingham and the West Midlands: Four Oaks station

Sutton Coldfield
Railway stations in Birmingham, West Midlands
DfT Category E stations
Former London and North Western Railway stations
Railway stations in Great Britain opened in 1884
Railway stations served by West Midlands Trains